

Kaavi Lighthouse (Estonian: Kaavi Tuletorn) is a lighthouse located in Sõrve Peninsula, in the village of Kaavi, Torgu Parish, in the island of Saaremaa, in Estonia.

The lighthouse is a concrete square tower, with a gallery but no lantern, mounted on a concrete square block. The lighthouse is painted brown with a broad white horizontal band in the centre of the structure. The lighthouse's location is on the southeast side of the Sõrve Peninsula, which is about four kilometres east of Mäebe.

See also 

 List of lighthouses in Estonia

References

External links 

 

Lighthouses completed in 1954
Resort architecture in Estonia
Lighthouses in Estonia
Saaremaa Parish
Buildings and structures in Saaremaa